Making Circles is the second album released by indie rock band The Seldon Plan, released in April 2005 by OTPRecords and re-released in September 2005 by Magnatune. Songs from this record were featured on Current TV, NPR, and the lonelygirl15 series.

Track listing
 "A Rhyming Dictionary" - 3:56
 "Making Circles" - 2:48
 "Westchester" - 2:03
 "Top Left Corner" - 3:35
 “[Aperitif]” - 3:24
 "Holding Patterns Are Slow" - 3:49
 "Love Again" - 3:13
 "Eyes Closed" - 3:42
 "Your Unmuddied Pasts" - 3:32
 "New Instant" - 3:33
 "Checkered Flag" - 2:52
 "Samuel P. Huntington" - 4:26
 "Chicago 2003" - 4:23

2005 albums
The Seldon Plan albums